You Are My Sunshine is Florida-based indie rock band Copeland's fourth full-length album. It was released on October 14, 2008.
The album marks Copeland's first release on the record label, Tooth & Nail Records. A vinyl version was released on January 27, 2009, followed by a re-release on August 26, 2014.

The bonus tracks were also made available on the standalone The Grey Man EP, release in 2009.

Credits
 Aaron Marsh - vocals, guitar, bass, keyboard, piano, producer, horn and strings arrangements
 Bryan Laurenson - guitar
 Jonathan Bucklew - drums, percussion
 Aaron Sprinkle – producer
 Michael Brauer – mixing, at Quad Studio, New York
 Rae Cassidy Klagstad - guest vocals on "Not So Tough Found Out", "On the Safest Ledge", and "The Day I Lost My Voice (The Suitcase Song)"
 Cakeface - programming
 Dan Bachelor - clarinet
 Jacob Kauffmann - bassoon
 Robert Parker - trumpet, flugelhorn
 Chris Carmichael - violin, viola, cello
 Troy Glessner Mastering S.P.E.C.T.R.E. MASTERING

Music videos

 "The Grey Man" 
 "Not So Tough Found Out" 
 "Strange and Unprepared" 
 "Should You Return" 
 "Chin Up" 
 "Good Morning Fire Eater" 
 "Not Allowed" 
 "To Be Happy Now" 
 "On the Safest Ledge"

References

External links

Copeland (band) albums
2008 albums
Albums produced by Aaron Marsh
Albums produced by Aaron Sprinkle